Severino Lima de Moura (born May 17, 1986 in Rio de Janeiro) is a retired Brazilian footballer who last played for Icasa in Campeonato Brasileiro Série C.

Career

Severino played in Lithuania with FK Vetra. Severino joined Beta Ethniki side Ethnikos Piraeus in January 2010. In August 2011 Severino Lima de Moura joined Daugava Daugavpils, playing in the Latvian Higher League. He played 3 matches, scoring no goals in his first season there. He helped the team win the bronze medals of the championship.

References

External links
 
 

1986 births
Living people
Brazilian footballers
Brazilian expatriate footballers
CR Flamengo footballers
Expatriate footballers in Lithuania
FC Mariupol players
Expatriate footballers in Ukraine
Brazilian expatriate sportspeople in Ukraine
Ethnikos Piraeus F.C. players
Expatriate footballers in Greece
Górnik Łęczna players
Expatriate footballers in Poland
Ukrainian Premier League players
Expatriate footballers in Latvia
FC Daugava players
Latvian Higher League players
Football League (Greece) players
Brazilian expatriate sportspeople in Latvia
Association football forwards
Footballers from Rio de Janeiro (city)